Yevdokiya Borisovna Yusupova (May 5 (NS: May 16) 1743, Moscow – July 19 (NS: July 8) 1780, Saint Petersburg), was a Duchess consort of Courland. She married the Duke of Courland, Peter von Biron, on March 6, 1774 in Mitava (Mittau). She had no issue.

Biography
Yevdokiya Yusupova was the eldest daughter of Prince Boris Grigoryevich Yusupov and Irina Mikhaylovna Zinovyeva. The marriage was arranged by empress Catherine II of Russia to secure a good relationship between Russia and Courland.

Courland
Duke Peter was described as wild, and Yevdokiya Yusupova was regarded as a beauty with spiritual qualities.  She became popular among the nobility in Courland and did succeed in her task to recruit Pro-Russians among the Courland nobility.  Initially, she also managed to wield some influence over Duke Peter.  

The relationship between Yusupova and Peter soon deteriorated, however, and she wished to be freed from the abuse he is reported to have treated her with.

Later life
After having attended the wedding of Tsesarevich Paul to Maria Feodorovna (Sophie Dorothea of Württemberg) on 26 September 1776, she refused to return to Mitau. The divorce was issued on 27 April 1778.

Yevdokiya Yusupova received the order of St Catherine in 1777.

References

1743 births
1780 deaths
18th-century Latvian people
Duchesses of Courland
Russian princesses
Yevdokiya
18th-century people from the Russian Empire
Burials at the Annunciation Church of the Alexander Nevsky Lavra